Rockville Junior-Senior High School was a public high school located in Rockville, Indiana. It closed after 2017–18 school year, consolidated into Parke Heritage High School.

See also
 List of high schools in Indiana

References

External links
 Official Website

Buildings and structures in Parke County, Indiana
Public middle schools in Indiana
Public high schools in Indiana